Below Deck is an American reality television series which premiered on July 1, 2013, on Bravo. The show chronicles the lives of the crew members who work and reside aboard a superyacht during charter season. It shows the crew as they deal with their personal issues in order to make their professional careers work. Every season ends with a special dedicated reunion episode of Watch What Happens Live! with Andy Cohen, in which the cast members discuss the events of the season.

Overview

Episodes

Season 1 (2013)

Season 2 (2014)

Season 3 (2015)

Season 4 (2016)

Season 5 (2017)

Season 6 (2018–19)

Season 7 (2019–20)

Episode 6 is listed as "Come Sail Away" for some TV provider listings

Season 8 (2020–21)

Season 9 (2021–22)

Season 10 (2022–23)

References

External links 
 
 

Below Deck (franchise)
Lists of reality television series episodes